There are over 9,000 Grade I listed buildings in England. This page is a list of these buildings in the district of Ryedale in North Yorkshire.

Ryedale

|}

Notes

External links

Ryedale
Lists of Grade I listed buildings in North Yorkshire
Ryedale